Berehomet,  is an urban-type settlement in Vyzhnytsia Raion (district) of Chernivtsi Oblast (province) in western Ukraine. It hosts the administration of Berehomet settlement hromada, one of the hromadas of Ukraine. The settlement lies on the Siret River.  At the 2001 census, the settlement's population was 8,513. Current population: 

One village is administered by the settlement, Zarichchia (Заріччя; Zaricicea).

People from Berehomet
 Baron Alexander Wassilko von Serecki (1823-1893), governor of the Duchy of Bucovina and member of the Herrenhaus 
 Count Georg Wassilko von Serecki (1864-1940), governor of the Duchy of Bucovina and hereditary member of the Herrenhaus
 Antin Kravs (1871-1945), Ukrainian Galician Army general.
 Odarka Kyselytsia, Ukrainian landscape and portrait painter, Honored Artist of Ukraine (1997).

References

Urban-type settlements in Vyzhnytsia Raion
Bukovina
Populated places established in the 16th century